Estonian Taekwondo Federation (abbreviation ETF) is one of the sport governing bodies in Estonia which deals with taekwondo.

ETF is established in 1992. ETF is a member of International Taekwon-Do Federation (ITF) and Estonian Olympic Committee.

References

External links
 

Sports governing bodies in Estonia
Martial arts in Estonia
Taekwondo organizations